The 70th Academy Awards ceremony, organized by the Academy of Motion Picture Arts and Sciences (AMPAS), took place on March 23, 1998, at the Shrine Auditorium in Los Angeles beginning at 6:00 p.m. PST / 9:00 p.m. EST. During the show, AMPAS presented Academy Awards (commonly referred to as Oscars) in 24 categories honoring films released in 1997. The ceremony, which was televised in the United States by ABC, was produced by Gil Cates and directed by Louis J. Horvitz. Actor Billy Crystal hosted the show for the sixth time. He had first hosted the 62nd ceremony held in 1990, and most recently the previous year's awards. Nearly a month earlier in an event held at the Regent Beverly Wilshire Hotel in Beverly Hills, California on February 28, the Academy Awards for Technical Achievement were presented by host Ashley Judd.

Titanic won eleven awards, including Best Picture, a number that is tied with Ben-Hur and The Lord of the Rings: The Return of the King. Other winners included As Good as It Gets, Good Will Hunting, and L.A. Confidential with two awards, and Character, The Full Monty, Geri's Game, The Long Way Home, Men in Black, A Story of Healing, and Visas and Virtue with one. The telecast garnered more than 57 million viewers in the United States, making it the most watched Oscars broadcast in history.

Winners and nominees

The nominees for the 70th Academy Awards were announced on February 10, 1998, at the Samuel Goldwyn Theater in Beverly Hills, California, by Robert Rehme, president of the academy, and actress Geena Davis. Titanic received the most nominations with a record-tying fourteen (1950's All About Eve, and later 2016's La La Land, also achieved this distinction); Good Will Hunting and L.A. Confidential came in second with nine apiece.

The winners were announced during the awards ceremony on March 23, 1998. With eleven awards, Titanic tied with Ben-Hur for the most Academy Awards in Oscar history. It also became the first film to win Best Picture without a screenwriting nomination since 1965's The Sound of Music. Jack Nicholson became the fourth performer to win at least three acting Oscars. Both Nicholson and Helen Hunt won for their roles in As Good as It Gets, making it the seventh film to win both lead acting awards. Nominated for their performances as Rose DeWitt Bukater in Titanic, Best Actress nominee Kate Winslet and Best Supporting Actress nominee Gloria Stuart became the first pair of actresses nominated for portraying the same character in the same film. At age 87, Stuart also became the oldest performer nominated for a competitive Oscar.

Awards

Winners are listed first, highlighted in boldface, and indicated with a double dagger.

Academy Honorary Award
 Stanley Donen

Films with multiple nominations and awards

The following 16 films received multiple nominations:

The following four films received multiple awards:

Presenters and performers
The following individuals presented awards or performed musical numbers.

Presenters

Performers

Ceremony information

In December 1997, the academy hired veteran Oscar telecast producer Gil Cates to oversee the 1998 ceremony. "Gil has become the consummate Oscar show producer, consistently garnering top television ratings for the telecast," said AMPAS President Robert Rehme in a press release announcing the selection. "His shows are full of wit, charm and surprise." A few days later, actor and comedian Billy Crystal was chosen to emcee the upcoming telecast. Cates explained his reason to bring back the veteran comedian saying, "Billy's performance last year was spectacular. There is nobody like him." In an article published in USA Today he initially requested to Cates and AMPAS five months after the previous year's ceremony that he would like to take a break from hosting duties. However, pressure from the academy, Cates, and several friends and family members made him reconsider his decision. His sixth stint would make him second only to Bob Hope in number of ceremonies hosted.

To commemorate the seventieth anniversary of the Academy Awards, 70 actors who have received both competitive and honorary awards appeared seated onstage together during a segment called Oscar's Family Album. Each former winner was acknowledged by announcer Norman Rose with the films he or she won for. At the end of the segment newly minted winners Kim Bassinger, Helen Hunt, and Robin Williams joined them. This marked the largest gathering of former winners since the 50th ceremony held in 1978.

Several others participated in the production of the ceremony. Bill Conti served as musical director for the telecast. Dancer Daniel Ezralow choreographed a dance number showcasing the nominees for Best Original Comedy or Musical Score. Bart the Bear made a surprise appearance during the presentation of the Best Sound Effects Editing award with Mike Myers.

Box office performance of nominees
At the time of the nominations announcement on February 10, the combined gross of the five Best Picture nominees was $579 million with an average of $116 million per film. Titanic was the highest earner among the Best Picture nominees with $338.7 million in domestic box office receipts. The film was followed by As Good as It Gets ($92.6 million), Good Will Hunting ($68.9 million), L.A. Confidential ($39.7 million), and finally The Full Monty ($38.7 million).

Of the top 50 grossing movies of the year, 40 nominations went to 15 films on the list. Only Titanic (1st), As Good as It Gets (16th), Good Will Hunting (20th), and In & Out (24th) were nominated for directing, acting, screenwriting, or Best Picture. The other top 50 box office hits that earned nominations were Men in Black (2nd), The Lost World: Jurassic Park (3rd), Air Force One (5th), My Best Friends Wedding (7th), Face/Off (9th), Con Air (12th), Contact (13th), Hercules (14th), The Fifth Element (25th), Anastasia (30th), and Starship Troopers (34th).

Critical response
The show received a positive reception from most media publications. Television critic Howard Rosenberg of the Los Angeles Times lauded Crystal's performance writing that he "would earn top billing as that unusual comedian as artful at doing musical comedy as jokes." San Francisco Chronicle columnist John Carman raved,"It was the best Oscar show in two decades." He also gave high marks for the host, commenting, "But last night, Crystal was back in razor form." The Seattle Times television editor Kay McFadden praised Crystal commenting that "he possesses nearly impeccable timing and judgment." In addition, she noted that while the ceremony dragged on, "Last night was one of television's smartest live ceremonies in recent memory."

Some media outlets were more critical of the show. Ray Richmond of Variety complained that the ceremony proved to be a "Yawner of an Oscarcast." He added that Crystal's "off-the-cuff one-liners sank faster than the great ship herself." Boston Globe television critic Matthew Gilbert bemoaned,"There was hardly a spontaneous moment during last night's Oscarcast." Film critic Carrie Rickey from The Philadelphia Inquirer lamented that the inevitable Titanic sweep "sank a telecast loaded with montages of previous years' Oscar highlights."

Ratings and reception
The popularity of Titanic greatly increased television ratings for the ceremony. The American telecast on ABC drew in an average of 57.25 million people over its length, which was a 29% increase from the previous year's ceremony. An estimated 87.50 million total viewers watched all or part of the awards. The show also earned higher Nielsen ratings compared to the previous ceremony with 35.32% of households watching over a 55.77 share. In addition, it garnered a higher 1849 demo rating with a 24.90 rating over a 44.30 share among viewers in that demographic. It overtook the network's own telecast of the 1983 Academy Awards to become, as it remains to date, the highest viewership for both an Academy Award telecast (since figures were compiled beginning with the 46th ceremony in 1974) and any live awards show airing in U.S. television history.

In July 1998, the ceremony presentation received eight nominations at the 50th Primetime Emmys. Two months later, the ceremony won five of those nominations for Outstanding Individual Performance in a Variety or Music Program (Billy Crystal), Outstanding Directing for a Variety or Music Program (Louis J Horvitz), Outstanding Lighting Direction (Electronic) for a Drama Series, Variety Series, Miniseries, or Movie (Bob Barnhart, Robert Dickinson, Matt Ford, Andy O'Reilly), Outstanding Music Direction (Bill Conti), and Outstanding Sound Mixing for a Variety Series or Special (Patrick Baltzell, Robert Douglass, Edward J. Greene, Tommy Vicari).

In Memoriam
The annual In Memoriam tribute was presented by actress Whoopi Goldberg. The montage featured an excerpt of "Appassionata" from The Passage composed by Michael J. Lewis.

 Lloyd Bridges - Actor
 Richard Jaeckel - Character actor
 Saul Chaplin – Composer/Musical Director
 Stanley Cortez – Cinematographer
 William Hickey - Actor
 Paul Jarrico – Screenwriter
 Dorothy Kingsley – Screenwriter
 Sydney Guilaroff – Hairstylist
 William H. Reynolds – Editor
 Billie Dove - Actress
 Jacques Cousteau – Filmmaker
 Stubby Kaye - Actor, comedian
 Red Skelton - Comedy entertainer
 Dawn Steel – Executive
 Toshiro Mifune - Japanese actor
 Brian Keith - Actor
 Chris Farley - Actor, comedian
 Leo Jaffe – Executive
 Samuel Fuller – Director
 Burgess Meredith - Actor
 J. T. Walsh - Character actor
 Robert Mitchum - Actor
 James Stewart - Actor

See also

 4th Screen Actors Guild Awards
 18th Golden Raspberry Awards
 40th Grammy Awards
 51st British Academy Film Awards
 52nd Tony Awards
 55th Golden Globe Awards
 List of submissions to the 70th Academy Awards for Best Foreign Language Film

References

Bibliography

External links
Official websites
 Academy Awards Official website
 The Academy of Motion Picture Arts and Sciences Official website
 Oscar's Channel at YouTube (run by the Academy of Motion Picture Arts and Sciences)

Analysis
 1997 Academy Awards Winners and History Filmsite
 Academy Awards, USA: 1998 Internet Movie Database

Other resources
 

1997 film awards
1998 in American cinema
Academy Awards ceremonies
1998 in Los Angeles
March 1998 events in the United States
Academy
Television shows directed by Louis J. Horvitz